Lukas Fridrikas (born 30 December 1997) is an Austrian professional footballer who plays as a striker for Austria Lustenau.

Career
Fridrikas is a product of the youth academies of Admira Wacker and Red Bull Salzburg. He began his senior career with Anif in 2015, before moving to Seekirchen where he scored 15 goals in 17 games. He then signed with Wiener Neustädter in January 2017. 

Fridrikas  moved to Dornbirn in 2018, and helped them get promoted into the 2. Liga. On 30 December 2020, he transferred to Wacker Innsbruck signing a contract until 2024. On 1 January 2022, he transferred to Austria Klagenfurt in the Austrian Football Bundesliga.

Personal life
Fridrikas is the son of the Lithuanian former international footballer Robertas and the Lithuanian-Austrian handball player Ausra. His paternal half-brother, Mantas, is also a Lithuanian international footballer.

References

External links
 
 OEFB Profile

1997 births
Living people
Austrian footballers
Austrian people of Lithuanian descent
USK Anif players
SV Seekirchen players
SC Wiener Neustadt players
FC Dornbirn 1913 players
FC Wacker Innsbruck (2002) players
SK Austria Klagenfurt players
Austrian Football Bundesliga players
2. Liga (Austria) players
Austrian Regionalliga players
Association football forwards